Westmoreland was launched at Whitby in 1800. She first sailed as a West Indiaman. From 1816 to 1821 and then again from 1823 to 1825 she sailed to India under a license from the British East India Company (EIC). Here crew abandoned her at sea on 22 October 1825. She eventually floated ashore on the coast of France and was salvaged.

Career
Westmoreland first appeared in Lloyd's Register (LR) in 1801.

In 1813 the EIC had lost its monopoly on the trade between India and Britain. British ships were then free to sail to India or the Indian Ocean under a license from the EIC.

Captain T.Cummins sailed for Fort William, India on 31 March 1817 under a license from the EIC. (The year may be a typo as other sources have Westmoreland, Cummins, master, arriving at Liverpool on 9 May 1817, having left Bengal on 14 December 1816.) 

Westmoreland, Crew, master, left Liverpool on 18 November 1818, but had to put back on 5 December leaky. A different report had her putting back because of a defective main mast.

Fate
Her crew abandoned Westmoreland, Worthington, master, in the Atlantic Ocean 15 leagues ( west of the Isles of Scilly. Charles rescued the crew. Westmoreland was on a voyage from Quebec City to Liverpool. She subsequently drifted ashore on the coast of Finistère, France and was taken in to a port near Brest.

Citations and references
Citations

References
 
 

1800 ships
Age of Sail merchant ships of England
Maritime incidents in October 1825